Limpley Stoke railway station is a former railway station in Limpley Stoke, Wiltshire, England, UK. The station was originally started by the Wilts, Somerset and Weymouth Railway, which was bought by the Great Western Railway before service started. The station served as a loading point for limestone from nearby quarries until 1960. Two camping coaches were positioned here by the Western Region from 1956 to 1957.
The station closed in 1966, and the building is now in private hands. The line remains open, and has regular passenger service.

References

Disused railway stations in Wiltshire
Former Great Western Railway stations
Railway stations in Great Britain opened in 1857
Railway stations in Great Britain closed in 1966
Beeching closures in England
1857 establishments in England